Anton Christoforidis (26 May 1917 – 19 October 1985) was a Greek professional light heavyweight boxer. He won the NBA Light Heavyweight Championship in 1941, making him the first Greek to become a world boxing champion.

Early life 
Christoforidis was born in Mersin, Ottoman Empire, but lived his first years in Smyrna. In 1922 he came to Athens, Greece as a refugee with his mother and his two sisters. His father and seven other relatives were killed in Asia Minor. His mother died two years after the family came to Athens. He had a very poor childhood, and was working in a hotel when he realized that he was a very strong boy and didn't mind fighting. He started boxing lessons and soon became the Athens champion, although he was only 16 years old. Then he decided to go to Paris where he grew up very soon in the boxing arenas.

He was a very competent boxer who possessed good skills and got the most out of his ability. Since he did not possess heavy hands, having only recorded thirteen knockouts in seventy-six fights (fifty-three wins), he relied on ring savvy and work-rate.

Christoforidis and Joey Maxim were sparring partners.

Professional career 

Christoforidis had most of his early fights in Europe, particularly in France. From 1934 to late 1939, he had 46 fights in Europe, and then went to the United States. His first bout was against Theodore Korenyi in Athens, Greece, which he won by second-round knockout. His last fight in Europe prior to his departure for America was a points win over the legendary Canadian welterweight/middleweight Lou Brouillard in April 1939.

On 8 November 1937, Christoforidis won both the Greek middleweight and Greek light heavyweight titles from Costas Vassis in Athens, Greece.

Christofordis defeated EBU (European) middleweight champion Bep van Klaveren on 14 November 1938 in Rotterdam, Netherlands and won the EBU title. One of the spectators was Adolf Hitler.

His first title defense was against France's Edouard Tenet in Paris, France. Anton was ahead on points going into the eleventh round, but broke his left hand that round and was forced to finish the fight on the defensive. He lost via decision.

He made his United States debut on 5 January 1940 in Madison Square Garden, defeating Willie Pavlovich by decision. At that point, Christoforidis settled in Geneva, Ohio. Anton next built up an eight fight winning streak, which was stopped when future Hall of Famer Jimmy Bivins bested him over 10 rounds. Anton once said, "I won that fight; it was strictly a hometown decision." In a rematch the next month, Christoforidis returned the favor and won a 10-round decision, handing Bivins the first defeat of his career.

The Bivins victory and successful results he had against other American opponents earned Christoforidis a bout with Melio Bettina for the vacant National Boxing Association world light heavyweight title. He won the light heavyweight crown on 13 January 1941 in Cleveland, Ohio, by defeating Melio Bettina in a unanimous decision of a fifteen-round bout. Bettina was winning slightly after twelve rounds, but Christofordis finished strong in the final three to win a decision popular with the spectators. The world light heavyweight title was recently stripped from Billy Conn, who failed to defend the belt in six months due to moving up in weight to challenge heavyweight champion Joe Louis.

After knockout wins over Italo Colonello and Johnny 'Bandit' Romero in non-title bouts, Christofordis lost to Gus Lesnevich by unanimous decision on 22 May 1941. Although this was not an NBA title fight, Lesnevich was later awarded the title by the NBA regardless on 24 May 1941.

On 12 January 1942, Christofordis suffered his first knockout loss at the hands of rising contender and future light heavyweight legend Ezzard Charles in Cincinnati, Ohio. Christoforidis was down for "six" and "nine" before the fight was stopped.

Christoforidis fought his last bout on 18 February 1947 against Anton Raadik. He retired with a record of 53 wins (13 by knockout), 15 losses and 8 draws.

Retirement, death and legacy 
Christoforidis ran a bar-restaurant in Geneva, Ohio, for several years after retiring from boxing in 1947. He was also fond of the Cleveland area.

In 1961, Christoforidis and his wife got divorced, and in 1968 he sold his interests in Geneva and moved to Florida to retire. In 1971, for the first time he took an extended trip back to Greece for an intended 45 days, but enjoyed it so much, he stayed for 15 years. Christoforidis was treated as a hero in Greece and enjoyed associating the rich and famous on the golf courses and, as he said, "being in shirt sleeves 12 months a year."

Christoforidis died suddenly of a heart attack while being in his car, on 19 October 1985 in Athens, Greece at the age of 67. He has made history by becoming the first Greek professional boxing world champion.

Professional boxing record

See also 
 List of light heavyweight boxing champions

Notes and references

External links 
 

1917 births
1985 deaths
Sportspeople from Mersin
Greeks from the Ottoman Empire
Sportspeople from Athens
Greek male boxers
Boxers from Ohio
Light-heavyweight boxers
World light-heavyweight boxing champions
Emigrants from the Ottoman Empire to Greece